Flora Spencer-Longhurst (born 1985 or 1986) is an English actress.  She is known for her roles in the CBBC series Leonardo (2011), and the FX series The Bastard Executioner (2015).

Early life 
Spencer-Longhurst joined the National Youth Music Theatre at age eleven, and subsequently studied at Manchester University.

Career
Spencer-Longhurst made her television debut in 2005 in the BBC television series Dalziel and Pascoe. Her professional stage debut was in 2007 at the Young Vic Theatre in a critically acclaimed production of The Member of the Wedding where she played the part of Frankie Addams.  She played Rosalie in the Lillian Helman play The Children's Hour at The Royal Exchange Theatre, Cecily in a musical adaptation of Oscar Wilde's The Importance of Being Earnest, and had also performed the role of Belle in a stage version of A Christmas Carol at the King's Head Theatre. In addition, she had roles as Reza in the West End production of the musical Once and Lavinia in Titus Andronicus at Shakespeare's Globe.

In 2011, she played the dual role of Lisa and Tomaso in the CBBC series Leonardo where she played the part of a girl disguised as an apprentice male artist. Other roles in television included Losing It with Martin Clunes, and the 2006 pilot episode of Inspector Lewis. Her motion picture debut Walking with the Enemy had won her a Best Supporting Actress award at the Fort Lauderdale International Film Festival and was released in April 2014.  She has also appeared in Wallander, Unforgiven, "Father Brown", and Walking with the Enemy.

Acting credits

Film and television 
 Dalziel and Pascoe (TV series) "Dust Thou Art" (2005) – Lisa Johnstone
 Inspector Lewis (2006 TV film, pilot episode) – Jessica Pollock
 Losing It (2006 TV film) – Erica MacNaughton
 The Family Man (2006 TV film) – Chloe
 The Afternoon Play (TV series) "The Real Deal" (2007) – Laura Fisher
 Wallander (TV series) "One Step Behind" (2008) – Isa
 Unforgiven (2009 TV series) – Emily Belcombe
 Comedy Showcase (TV series) "Chickens" (2011) – Gracie
 Taken (2011 short film) – Jill Maine
 Leonardo (2011–12 TV series) – Lisa/Tomaso/Tom
 Father Brown (TV series) "The Face of Death" (2013) – Lucia Galloway
 Beautiful Relics (2013 short film)
 Walking with the Enemy (2014) – Rachel Schoen
 The Bastard Executioner (TV series) (2015) –  Baroness Lowry "Love" Aberffraw Ventris
 Oasis (TV Series) (2017) - Bea
 Midsomer Murders (TV Series) "The Curse of the Ninth" (2017) - Natalie Wheeler

Theatre 
 Member of the Wedding (Young Vic Theatre) 2007 – Frankie Addams
 Ghosts (Young Vic Theatre) 2008 – Regina Engstrand
 Girl With a Pearl Earring (Theatre Royal Haymarket) 2008 – Cornelia Vermeer
 The Children's Hour (Royal Exchange Theatre) 2008 – Rosalie Wells
 A Christmas Carol (King's Head Theatre) 2009 – Belle
 The Beggar's Opera (Open Air Theatre) 2011 – Polly Peacham
 The Importance of Being Earnest (Theatre Royal, Windsor) 2011 – Cecily Cardew
 Once (Phoenix Theatre) 2013 – Reza
 Titus Andronicus (Shakespeare's Globe) 2014 – Lavinia
 Love's Labour's Lost (Royal Shakespeare Theatre) 2014 – Katharine
 Love's Labour's Won (also known as Much Ado About Nothing) (Royal Shakespeare Theatre) 2014 – Hero
 A Christmas Truce (Royal Shakespeare Theatre) 2014 – Mrs. Godrey
 The Real Thing (2017) for director Stephen Unwin, playing Annie  — Theatre Royal, Bath.

References

External links
 
 Flora Spencer-Longhurst on United Agents

Living people
English television actresses
English stage actresses
21st-century English actresses
1985 births
Actresses from Birmingham, West Midlands
Alumni of the University of Manchester